Zabelle C. Boyajian (1873 – 26 January 1957) was an Armenian painter, writer, and translator, who lived most of her life in London.

Biography
Zabelle C. Boyajian was born in Diyarbakır in the Diyarbekir Vilayet of the Ottoman Empire  (one of the ancient Armenian capitals, Tigranakert) into the family of the British Vice-Consul in Diyarbakır and Harput Thomas Boyajian and Catherine Rogers, a descendant of the English poet Samuel Rogers. After her father's murder during the Hamidian massacres, in 1895, Boyajian, her mother and her brother, Henry, moved to London, where she enrolled at the Slade School of Fine Art. She also started writing and illustrating her own books. Her first novel, Yestere: The Romance of a Life, about the massacres in Sasun, was published under the pen name Varteni (London, 1901). She was very close with Anna Raffi, the wife of the Armenian novelist Raffi, and her two sons, Aram and Arshak, who had moved to London after Raffi's death. Boyajian periodically translated and published excerpts from Raffi's novels in the journal Ararat and organized various reading events to honor his work. In 1916, she compiled and translated the anthology Armenian Legends and Poems (1916), which was introduced by Viscount James Bryce and which included several poems in Alice Stone Blackwell's translation. She traveled widely and in 1938 published her travel notes and illustrations of Greece, In Greece with Pen and Palette. In 1948 she translated and published Avetik Isahakian's epic poem Abu Lala Mahari. Boyajian also wrote essays on Shakespeare, Byron, Euripides, Michael Arlen, Raffi, and Avetik Isahakian, as well as comparative works on English and Armenian literature.

As a painter, Boyajian had her individual exhibitions in London in 1910 and 1912, in Germany in 1920, in Egypt in 1928, in France, in Italy, and in Belgium between 1940-50.

Boyajian died on 26 January 1957 in London.

Books 
 Armenian Legends and Poems. Trans. Z. C. Boyajian. New York: Columbia University Press, 1st ed., 1916.
 Gilgamesh: A Dream of the Eternal Quest. London: George W. Jones, 1924.
 In Greece with Pen and Palette. London: J.M. Dent & Sons, 1938.

Critical reception 
The Contemporary Review (December 1916) wrote about the anthology Armenian Legends and Poems:

Scotsman (November 18, 1916) wrote:

The Manchester Guardian wrote about Boyajian's art work:

(Qtd in A. A. Bedikian's "The Poet and Artist: A Profile of Zabelle Boyajian" Ararat Magazine Summer 1960)

References

1873 births
1957 deaths
People from Diyarbakır
People from Diyarbekir vilayet
Armenians from the Ottoman Empire
British people of Armenian descent
Emigrants from the Ottoman Empire to the United Kingdom
Alumni of the Slade School of Fine Art
Ethnic Armenian painters
Translators from Armenian
20th-century translators
20th-century Armenian painters
20th-century women writers
Survivors of the Hamidian massacres
20th-century Armenian women artists